Newton is a village and civil parish  south west of Hereford, in the county of Herefordshire, England. In 2011 the parish had a population of 139. The parish touches Dulas, Longtown, Michaelchurch Escley and St. Margarets. Newton shares a parish council with Michaelchurch Escley, St Margarets, Turnastone and Vowchurch called "Vowchurch and District Group Parish Council".

Landmarks 
There are 16 listed buildings in Newton. Newton has a church called St John the Baptist.

History 
The name "Newton" means 'New farm/settlement'. Newton was formerly a township and chapelry in the parish of Clodock, in 1866 Newton became a civil parish in its own right.

References 

Villages in Herefordshire
Civil parishes in Herefordshire